was a district located in Hyōgo Prefecture, Japan.

As of 2003, the Hikami district had an estimated population of 71,753 and a density of 145.46 persons per km2. The total area was 493.28 km2.

Former towns and villages
 Aogaki
 Hikami
 Ichijima
 Kaibara
 Kasuga
 Sannan

Merger
On November 1, 2004 - the towns of Aogaki, Hikami, Ichijima, Kaibara, Kasuga and Sannan were merged to create the city of Tamba. Hikami District was dissolved as a result of this merger.

Former districts of Hyōgo Prefecture